Bellfield is a council housing area in the south-east of Kilmarnock, Scotland.

Education 
Bellfield is home to two primary schools Kirkstyle Primary School and  Bellfield Primary School (Both to be replaced by a new school). Kirkstyle Primary has two entrances; the main entrance is from Carron avenue across a car park, and the other from Annan road across a car park and onto a playground and grassed area. Bellfield Primary has a car park entrance on Tinto Avenue and a pupil entrance on Whatriggs Road.

Transport 
Bellfield is served by two bus routes, provided by the Stagecoach Group. These are the number 6 and the number 7. The number 6 service goes out by Asda and then through the town centre. The number 7 provides a quicker route to the town centre.

Local Amenities 
A group of shops, located on Whatriggs Road, opposite the primary school, serve the local community. Known locally as "The Bellfield Shoaps" ("shoap" being the Scots word for shop), these comprise two grocery shops, a charity shop, a Library and council office, a butcher's, two hairdresser's, a Chinese takeaway (Wing Wah) and an Indian takeaway. One of the grocery shops is "Morning ,Noon & Night ", more usually known locally as "The Co-Op".

Bellfield had a community centre, also located on Whatriggs Road (That has since been demolished).
 East Ayrshire Council

Kilmarnock
Housing estates in Scotland